7-Methyl-α-ethyltryptamine (7-Me-αET) is a tryptamine derivative related to α-ethyltryptamine (αET). It was discovered by a team at Upjohn in the early 1960s.  It has similar pharmacological effects to αET, but is both 3-4 times more potent as a serotonin releasing agent, and 10 times more potent as a monoamine oxidase inhibitor, making it potentially hazardous as this pharmacological profile is shared with drugs such as PMA and 4-MTA, which are known to be dangerous in humans when used at high doses.

See also 
 4-Methyl-αET
 5-Fluoro-αMT
 5-Fluoro-αET
 7-Methyl-DMT
 7-Chloro-AMT

References 

Monoamine oxidase inhibitors
Serotonin receptor agonists
Serotonin-norepinephrine-dopamine releasing agents
Tryptamines